Stephen Patrick Glanvill Henighan (born 19 June 1960) is a Canadian novelist, short story writer, journalist and academic.

Born in Hamburg, Germany, Henighan arrived in Canada at the age of five and grew up in rural eastern Ontario. He studied political science at Swarthmore College in Pennsylvania, where he won the Potter Short Story Prize in April 1981. From 1984 to 1992 he lived in Montreal as a freelance writer and completed an M.A. at Concordia University. Between 1992 and 1996 he earned a doctorate in Spanish American literature at Wadham College, Oxford. While at Oxford, Henighan became the first writer to have stories published in three different editions of the annual May Anthology of Oxford and Cambridge Short Stories. He also studied in Colombia, Romania and Germany. From 1996 to 1998 Henighan taught Latin American literature at Queen Mary & Westfield College, University of London. Since 1999 he has taught at the University of Guelph, Ontario.

Henighan has published six novels. His short stories have been published in Canada, the U.S., Great Britain and, in translation, in Europe, in journals such as Ploughshares, Lettre Internationale, The Malahat Review, The Fiddlehead., Queen's Quarterly, Prairie Fire. Henighan's novels and stories feature immigrants, travellers and other displaced people caught between cultures. According to the journal Canadian Literature, Henighan is "a writer who looks hard at the complexities and rebarbative elements of the multicultural, globalized world we live in."

Henighan's journalism has appeared in The Times Literary Supplement, The Walrus, Geist, The Globe and Mail, Toronto Life, Adbusters and the Montreal Gazette. He has been a finalist for the Governor General's Award, and the Canada Prize in the Humanities. In 2006 Henighan set off a controversy when he attacked the Giller Prize.

As an academic, he has published articles on Latin American literature and Lusophone African fiction, a book on the Nobel Prize-winning Guatemalan novelist Miguel Ángel Asturias and a 776-page study of the analysis of the history of Nicaragua presented in the work of Ernesto Cardenal and Sergio Ramírez.

Henighan has published translations from Spanish, Portuguese and Romanian, including Angolan writer Ondjaki, Cabo Verdean writer Germano Almeida, Nicaraguan poet Carlos Rigby, and the Romanian writer Mihail Sebastian, and is general editor of a translation series run by Biblioasis, a literary publisher based in Windsor, Ontario. Writers recruited by Henighan for the Biblioasis International Translation Series include Horacio Castellanos Moya, Mia Couto, Liliana Heker and Emili Teixidor.  As a translator, Henighan has twice been a longlist finalist for the Best Translated Book Award, and once for the International Dublin Literary Award.

Bibliography

Novels
Other Americas (1990) Simon & Pierre
The Places Where Names Vanish (1998) Thistledown Press
The Streets of Winter (2004) Thistledown Press
The Path of the Jaguar (2016) Thistledown Press
Mr Singh Among the Fugitives (2017) Linda Leith Publishing
The World of After (2021) Cormorant Books

Short story collections
Nights in the Yungas (1992) Thistledown Press
North of Tourism (1999) Cormorant Books
A Grave in the Air (2007) Thistledown Press
Blue River and Red Earth (2018) Cormorant Books

Non-fiction
Assuming the Light: The Parisian Literary Apprenticeship of Miguel Ángel Asturias (1999) Legenda
When Words Deny the World: The Reshaping of Canadian Writing (2002) The Porcupine's Quill
Lost Province: Adventures in a Moldovan Family (2002) Beach Holme Publishing
A Report on the Afterlife of Culture (2008) Biblioasis
A Green Reef: The Impact of Climate Change (2013) Linda Leith Publishing
Sandino's Nation: Ernesto Cardenal and Sergio Ramirez Writing Nicaragua, 1940-2012 (2014) McGill-Queen's University Press

Translations
Good Morning Comrades (novel by Angolan writer Ondjaki) (2008) Biblioasis
The Accident (novel by Romanian writer Mihail Sebastian) (2011) Biblioasis
Granma Nineteen and the Soviet's Secret  (novel by Angolan writer Ondjaki) (2014) Biblioasis
Transparent City (novel by Angolan writer Ondjaki) (2018) Biblioasis.   U.K. Edition: (2021) Europa Editions UK

Collaborative books
Guiomar Borrás A., Stephen Henighan, James M. Hendrickson, Antonio Velásquez, Intercambios. Spanish for Global Communication (2006) Thomson, Nelson
Stephen Henighan and Candace Johnson, editors. Human and Environmental Justice in Guatemala (2018) University of Toronto Press

External links 
University of Guelph webpage
https://web.archive.org/web/20110518024345/http://www.writersunion.ca/ww_profile.asp?mem=1065&L=H&N=Stephen Henighan
On Translation 
Henighan's own website
Stephen Henighan at Geist.com

References 

Canadian male novelists
Canadian male short story writers
Canadian non-fiction writers
1960 births
German emigrants to Canada
Journalists from Ontario
Living people
Academics of Queen Mary University of London
Concordia University alumni
Swarthmore College alumni
Academic staff of the University of Guelph
20th-century Canadian short story writers
21st-century Canadian short story writers
20th-century Canadian novelists
21st-century Canadian novelists
20th-century Canadian male writers
21st-century Canadian male writers
Canadian male non-fiction writers